Catherine Nakhabi Omanyo (born c. 1978) is a Kenyan politician. She is the woman member of Parliament for Busia County. She founded the school International School for Champions in Nairobi, although the school is now in Busia close to the border with Uganda.

Life
Omanyo was born in Busia around 1978. Her father died when she was fourteen, and her mother refused to become the wife of her husband's brother as was the custom. Her husband's family saw this as an insult and her mother had to manage without them. Omanyo was the fourth of ten children and she was very keen to get an education but her mother could not afford the school fees. Omanyo would sneak into classes to listen to the teacher, but when she was discovered she would be punished and ejected.

Omanyo was shocked that children in Nairobi were idle because they could not afford lessons, so she decided to teach two of them where she was working as a nanny. The idea was well-received and before long she had about 50 pupils. She was surprised that the authorities did not appreciate her efforts when the police arrived and she was threatened with prosecution for running an unlicensed school. She was able to negotiate a fortnight's reprieve and during that time she was able to gain legitimate paperwork. The paperwork released her from prosecution but she was now officially responsible for a school which she initially called the Impreza School. The school started in Nairobi in 2001.

In 2006 Omanyo started a fumigation campaign to get rid of jigger fleas. The campaign led to hundreds of homes being treated, but in 2007 conflict broke out in Nairobi and she had to close the school building and move. She left with a few teachers and thirty children who could not be left behind as the school was their only hope. The lorry driver who took them away was murdered by a mob on his return. Omanyo reformed the school in Busia and the age range was increased as she was given another school to run by another charity.

Later, Omanyo took two weeks of her time to visit Teignmouth in Devon in 2009 so that she could thank the people of the area for the support they give the school. She met many of the school's supporters and she was surprised to observe so few thin people in Devon, until she realised that the supply of food was rarely a problem there as it was in Kenya. In 2017 she had her third attempt to be elected a member of parliament. Only a small number of women are elected despite a law that requires a gender balance better than two-thirds. In the following year she was one of many who protested when President Kenyatta proposed that all of the Cabinet Sectraries he appointed should be men.

In 2021 Omanyo's school was chosen as one of the top four choices for giving to improve education in an article in The New York Times. The author, Peter Coy, recommended the Wikimedia Foundation, the Khan Academy, Children International, and Omanyo and her school. Coy chose Omanyo because he had previously given to the school.

Support
The school enjoys support from people in England and in America. A 16-year-old English girl, Sarah Hulme, of Torquay Girls' Grammar School visited the school and when she returned to Britain she started to raise funds. The charity was founded a year after. Others including the headteacher became involved and the town raises £475 each week to support the school. The school has received funding from the UK Government's Department for International Development to cover the costs of teachers and an exchange scheme for nine teachers.

Private life
Omanyo is married to Daron, an American-born pastor.

References 

1970s births
Living people
Year of birth uncertain
People from Busia County
21st-century Kenyan women politicians
21st-century Kenyan politicians
School founders
Members of the 13th Parliament of Kenya